Notodoris gardineri is a sea slug, which is a species of nudibranch, a shell-less marine gastropod mollusc in the family Aegiridae.

Description
Notodoris gardineri can reach more than 10 cm long.
In different geographical regions the background color of the animal can vary. In the archipelagoes of the Maldives and Laccadives, the body is black with yellow spots while in the rest of the distribution range the body is yellow with black spots.
The size and numbers of spots vary from one individual to another. The gills are situated in the center of the dorsal side, they are yellow and protected by three round lobes.
The body is stiff and protected by small spicules. The rhinophores are smooth, simple, yellow and retractable. 
Notodoris gardineri can be mistaken for Notodoris minor, whose body colour is also yellow with black markings except that in the latter the black forms lines on the body and not spots.

Distribution
This species occurs in the tropical Indo-West Pacific.

Habitat
This nudibranch lives on the external slope or top of coral reefs, commonly at 7 to 15 m depth.

Feeding
Notodoris gardineri feeds mainly, according to the actual observations, on sponges of the family of Leucettidae as Pericharax heterographis or Leucetta primigenia.

Behaviour
This Notodoris is benthic and diurnal, moves at sight without fear of being taken for a prey.

References

 Fahey S.J. & Gosliner T.M. 2004.  A phylogenetic analysis of the Aegiridae Fischer, 1883 (Mollusca, Nudibranchia, Phanerobranchia) with descriptions of eight new species and a reassessment of Phanerobranch relationships. Proceedings of the California Academy of Sciences, (4) 55(34): 613–689
 Yonow N. (2012)  Opisthobranchs from the western Indian Ocean, with descriptions of two new species and ten new records (Mollusca, Gastropoda). ZooKeys 197: 1–129

Bibliographical references
 P.L. Beesley, G.J.B. Ross & A. Wells, "Mollusca - The Southern Synthesis", vol.5, CSIRO, 1998, 
 David Behrens,"Nudibranch behaviour", Newworld Publication INC., 2005, 
 Gary Cobb & Richard Willan,"Undersea jewels- a colour guide to nudibranchs", Australian Biological Resources Study, 2006, 
 Neville Coleman, "Marine life of Maldives", Atoll editions, 2004, 
 Andrea & Antonnella Ferrrari,"Macrolife", Nautilus publishing, 2003,

External links 

 ITIS, Notodoris gardineri

Aegiridae
Gastropods described in 1906